Marvel Super Hero Squad: The Infinity Gauntlet is a fighting video game, and the sequel to Marvel Super Hero Squad. It was released in November 2010 for Nintendo DS, PlayStation 3, and Wii, and was released for the first time on a Microsoft console, the Xbox 360. Similar to the first game, it features cartoonish super-deformed versions of the Marvel Comics characters, as seen in the Marvel Super Hero Squad toy line, as well as the television show. The 3DS version was released in 2011.

Gameplay
There are three modes of play in the game: the first is Story Mode, which allows a single player to complete the game story with a limited selection of heroes available; the second mode is Challenge Mode, which allows up to four players to play together with an increased choice of thirty different Marvel superheroes and supervillains; the final mode of play is Freeplay Mode, which allows the player to go back to any level and replay it as any playable character.

The game features levels based on locations from the animated series, and also has a number of collectable objects from the Marvel Universe that unlock additional in-game content such as costumes, as well as some items being unlocked by completing mission objectives.

The Story Mode is loosely based on the Marvel: Ultimate Alliance franchise. After completing the first three missions, the player gets sent to the Hellicarrier to continue with their mission, try out Freeplay or even find some hidden objects in the Hellicarrier each time a mission is completed.

Plot
Hulk and Iron Man go shopping in Outer Space to get boots for Thor's birthday. At some point the boots are mixed up with the Super-Skrull's laundry, so the two Squaddies follow him. When Thanos receives a box containing the Infinity Gauntlet, he finds out that Iron Man and Hulk are within his ship. After a battle with Super-Skrull, the Squaddies escape back to the Helicarrier. Iron Man notifies the rest of the squad that they must find all of the Infinity Stones before Thanos does. While Iron Man makes his speech, Doctor Doom, Silver Surfer, Nebula and Loki listen in.

Falcon and Thor retrieve the Rhythm stone from Hercules, which is later revealed to be a fake gemstone with Loki and the Enchantress hidden inside. Hulk and She-Hulk retrieve the Mind stone from Nightmare. Invisible Woman and Nova are sent to the Negative Zone to get the Time stone from Nebula and Annihilus. Iron Man and Wolverine get the Soul stone from the Grandmaster.

Scarlet Witch and Quicksilver move throughout Asteroid M in order to retrieve the Space stone. Spider-Man and Reptil later go and retrieve the Reality stone, while also dealing with Abomination, who is trying to break Doctor Doom out of prison..

Wolverine and Black Widow later pay a visit to the Skrull Throne World where they meet the Silver Surfer as he reveals that Galactus is planning to consume the world. They successfully stop Galactus. Meanwhile, the Helicarrier goes under an attack and the squad loses the Infinity Gems to Thanos. Later on, the Squaddies defeats Thanos, but Silver Surfer steals the stones. He becomes the Dark Surfer (although he is called the Infinity Warrior in the game), and each squad member (with the exception of Spider-Man) with the same factor team up together to stop Dark Surfer (as he splits himself up into six). Sometime, later as Thor receives his boots, he later finds out that Loki has put a hex on them, so Thor must dance for eternity. Ending the game, Iron Man and Hulk plan to return the boots.

Development
In July 2010, THQ unveiled the trailer for Marvel Super Hero Squad: The Infinity Gauntlet at San Diego Comic-Con. Also in October, the game made its first interactive appearance at New York Comic-Con held at the Jacob Javitts center in midtown Manhattan.

Reception

The 3DS, PlayStation 3 and Xbox 360 versions received "mixed" reviews, while the Wii version received "generally unfavorable reviews", according to the review aggregation website Metacritic.

Legacy

A sequel was released in November 2011. The game requires the uDraw GameTablet. Comic Combat was developed by Griptonite Games and THQ.

References

External links 
 
 
 
 

2010 video games
Beat 'em ups
Fighting games
Griptonite Games
Multiplayer and single-player video games
Nintendo 3DS games
Nintendo DS games
PlayStation 3 games
Superhero video games
THQ games
Video game sequels
Video games based on Marvel Comics
Video games scored by Mick Gordon
Wii games
Xbox 360 games
Video games developed in the United States